librsb is an open-source parallel library for sparse matrix computations using the Recursive Sparse Blocks (RSB) matrix format.
                          
librsb provides cache efficient multi-threaded Sparse BLAS operations via OpenMP, and is best suited to large sparse matrices.

Features 
librsb provides:
Conversion from/to COO, CSR, CSC sparse matrix formats.
Support for the four BLAS types.
Support for general, symmetric, hermitian matrices.
Parallel threaded, eventually strided:
Sparse matrix-vector multiplication.                                                                                         
Sparse matrix-dense matrix multiplication.
Sparse matrix-vector triangular solve.
Sparse matrix-dense matrix triangular solve.
Sparse matrix-sparse matrix multiplication.
Elemental sparse matrix operations (scaling, add, etc).
Row-wise or column-wise scaling.
Rows / columns extraction.
An online empirical autotuning function.
File input/output in the Matrix Market format.
Rendering of the RSB structure into EPS (Encapsulated Postscript) figures.
A program for benchmarking / testing performance.
Implements the Sparse BLAS standard, as specified in the BLAS Technical Forum. documents.

System requirements         
librsb can be used from:

C and C++ (rsb.h interface)
Fortran 90/95/2003 (module rsb)
GNU Octave (sparsersb package for GNU Octave) GNU Octave package

References 

  Martone, M. Efficient multithreaded untransposed, transposed or symmetric sparse matrix-vector multiplication with the Recursive Sparse Blocks format. ''Parallel Computing 40(7): 251-270 (2014)'

External links 
 
 librsb.sourceforge.net

Numerical linear algebra
C (programming language) libraries
Fortran libraries
Free software programmed in C
Numerical libraries
Scientific simulation software
Free simulation software
Free software programmed in Fortran